This is a list of women artists who were born in Ireland or whose artworks are closely associated with that country.

A
Anne Acheson (1882–1962), sculptor
Mary Alment (1834–1908), landscape, portrait artist
Mary Arrigan (born 15 February 1943),  illustrator, artist and novelist

B
Ethelwyn Baker (1899–1988), sculptor 
Maude Mary Ball (1883–1969), painter and sculptor
Ethel Gresley Ball (1886–1959), painter and sculptor
Moyra Barry (1886–1960), flower painter 
Rose Maynard Barton (1856–1929), painter
Mary Battersby (fl. 1801–1841), painter, naturalist
Frances Beckett (1880–1951), painter
Edith Anna Bell (1870–1929), sculptor
Dorothy Blackham (1896–1975), illustrator, painter, educator
Edith Blake (1846–1926), botanical illustrator, writer
Norma Borthwick (1862–1934), British artist, writer, Irish language activist
Alicia Boyle (1908–January 1997), landscape artist
Nicola Gordon Bowe (1948–2018), art historian, educator
Gretta Bowen (1880–1981), painter
Sarah Bowie (fl. 2010s), illustrator, author, cartoonist
Muriel Brandt (1909–1981), painter
Ruth Brandt (1936–1989), painter, educator
Melanie Le Brocquy (1919–2018), sculptor 
Colleen Browning (1929–2003), realist painter
Laura Buckley (1977–2022), video and installation artist
Letitia Bushe (c. 1705/1710–1757), water painter, miniaturist
Mildred Anne Butler (1885–1941), painter

C
Margaret Callan (c.1817–c.1883), teacher, nationalist, writer, used the pseudonym Thornton MacMahon
Maeve Clancy, paper cut artist, illustrator
Ellen Creathorne Clayton (1834–1900), painter
Margaret Clarke (1888–1961), portrait painter
Anne Cleary (born 1965), installation and video artist
Susan Connolly (artist) (born 1976), contemporary artist
Amanda Coogan (born 1971), performance artist
Catherine Teresa Cookson (fl. 1830s), botanical artist
Kathleen Cox (1904–1972), Irish artist, sculptor, mystic
Mia Cranwill (1880–1972), designer, metal artist
Dorothy Cross (born 1956), contemporary artist
Amelia Curran (1775–1847), portrait painter
Fanny Currey (1848–1917), horticulturalist and watercolour painter

D
Elinor Darwin (1879–1954), illustrator, engraver, portrait painter
Lilian Davidson (1879–1954), painter, writer
Kate Dobbin (1868–1955), watercolour artist
Phoebe Donovan (1902–May 1998), flower, landscape and portrait artist
Anne Donnelly (born 1932), painter
Susanna Drury (1698–1770), landscape painter

E
Frances Anne Edgeworth (1769–1865), botanical artist, memoirist
Diana Conyngham Ellis (1813–1851), botanical artist 
Beatrice Elvery (1881–1970), stained-glass artist, painter

F
Marianne Fannin (1845–1938), botanical artist
Genieve Figgis (born 1972), contemporary painter
Kathleen Fox (1880–1963), painter, enamellist, stained glass artist

G
Catherine Gage (1815–1892), botanist, botanical and ornithological illustrator
Wilhelmina Geddes (1887–1955), stained glass artist
Evelyn Gleeson (1855–1944), embroidery, carpet, and tapestry designer
Carol Graham (born 1951), contemporary artist.
Eileen Gray (1879–1976), furniture designer, architect
Elizabeth Gray (died 1903), painter, etcher, photographer
Beatrice Gubbins (1878–1944), watercolour artist
Althea Gyles (1868–1949), poet, painter, illustrator

H
Eva Henrietta Hamilton (1876–1960), painter
Letitia Marion Hamilton (1878–1964), landscape painter
Marianne-Caroline Hamilton (1777–1861), artist, memoirist
Marie Hanlon (born 1948), painter
Alice Hanratty (born 1939), printmaker 
Sarah Cecilia Harrison (1863–1941), painter
Gertrude Hartland (1865–1954), illustrator
Gabriel Hayes (1909–1978), sculptor 
Mercedes Helnwein (born 1979), painter, writer, video artist
Grace Henry (1868–1953), Scottish landscape artist
Mary Balfour Herbert (1817–1893), watercolourist
Katie Holten (born 1975), contemporary artist 
Helen Hooker (1905–1993), sculptor, portrait painter
Evie Hone (1894–1955), painter, stained glass artist

J
Alice Jacob (1862–1921), botanical illustrator, lace designer, design teacher
Joan Jameson (1892–1953), still-life, landscape and figure artist
Yvonne Jammet (1900–1967), landscape painter, sculptor
Mainie Jellett (1897–1944), painter
Debbie Jenkinson, illustrator and comics artist
Rachel Joynt (born 1966), sculptor

K
Harriet Kavanagh (1799–1885), artist, traveller, antiquarian
Frances Kelly (1908–2002), painter
Martha King (c.1803–1897), botanical artist
Alice Sarah Kinkead (1871–1926), painter

L
Elish Lamont (c.1800/1816–1870), miniaturist
Grania Langrishe (born 1934), botanical illustrator
Lady Hazel Lavery (1880–1935), artist
 Mary Concepta Lynch (1874–1939), Irish nun and calligrapher

M
Gladys Maccabe (1918–2018), painter
Isa Macnie (1869–1958), croquet champion, cartoonist, suffragist and activist
Anne Madden (born 1932), painter
Anne Magill, painter, illustrator
Alice Maher (born 1956), multidisciplinary artist
Mary Manning (1853–1930), landscape artist, teacher
Sine MacKinnon (1901–1996), landscape artist
Kathleen Marescaux (1868–1944), painter
Sheila McClean (active since late 20th century), painter
Siobhan McDonald multidisciplinary artist
Norah McGuinness (1901–1980), painter, illustrator
Yvonne McGuinness (born 1972), contemporary artist 
Eva McKee (1890–1955), craftswoman and designer
Flora Mitchell (1890–1973), American-born Irish artist
Dorothy Molloy (1942–2004), poet and artist

O
Catherine Amelia O'Brien (1881–1963), stained glass artist
Florence Vere O'Brien (1854–1936), diarist, philanthropist, craftswoman
Geraldine O'Brien (1922–2014), botanical illustrator
Kitty Wilmer O'Brien (1910–1983), landscape artist
Nelly O'Brien (1864–1925), miniaturist, landscape artist, Gaelic League activist
Harriet Osborne O'Hagan (1830–1921), portrait artist
Helen Sophia O'Hara (1846–1920), watercolour artist
Bea Orpen (1913–1980), landscape and portrait painter, teacher
Catherine Isabella Osborne (1818–1880), artist, writer, patron

P
Aine Phillips (born 1965), performance artist, writer
Ellice Pilkington (1869–1936), women's activist and artist
Katherine Plunket (1820–1932), botanical illustrator
Caroline Pounds (fl. 1840–1880), watercolour artist
Rosamond Praeger (1867–1954), artist, sculptor, poet, writer
Kathy Prendergast (born 1958), artist, sculptor 
Sarah Purser (1848–1943), stained glass artist

R
Mary Redmond (1863–1930), sculptor
Nano Reid (1900–1981), painter
Ethel Rhind (1877–1952), stained-glass and mosaic artist
Anne Rigney (born 1957), abstract artist, sculptor
Elizabeth Rivers (1903–1964), stained-glass, painter, engraver, illustrator
Florence Ross (1870–1949), artist

S
Caroline Scally (1886–1973), landscape artist
Susan Sex (born 1947), botanical artist
Estella Solomons (1882–1968), painter 
Elizabeth Shaw (1920–1992), illustrator, children's book author
Everina Sinclair (1870–1966), woodworker and teacher
Niamh Sharkey author and illustrator of children’s picturebooks
Camille Souter (born 1929), painter
Stella Steyn (1907–1987), painter, illustrator
Sophia St John Whitty (1877–1924), woodcarver, teacher, cooperativist
Imogen Stuart (born 1927), German-Irish sculptor
Mary Swanzy (1882–1978), landscape and genre artist
Mary Rankin Swan (c.1855–?), portrait artist

T
Phoebe Anna Traquair (1852–1936), illustrator, painter, embroiderer
Helen Mabel Trevor (1831–1900), painter
Alys Fane Trotter (1862–1961), poet, artist

V
Dairine Vanston (1903–1988), landscape artist
Lilla Vanston (1870–1959), sculptor, portrait painter

W
Sophia Wellbeloved (born 1940), sculptor
Sophia St John Whitty (1877–1924), woodcarver
Daphne Wright (born 1963), visual artist
Gladys Wynne (1876–1968), watercolourist

Y
Anne Yeats (1919–2001), painter, stage designer
Lily Yeats (1866–1949), embroiderer
Mabel Young (1889–1974), artist

-
Irish women artists, List of
Artists, List of Irish women
Artists